Mungallala is a rural town and locality in the Maranoa Region, Queensland, Australia.

Geography 

The Warrego Highway passes from east (Womalilla) to west (Morven) through the locality, passing through the town which is in the eastern part of the locality. The Western railway line also passes from east to west through the locality, roughly parallel and to the south of the highway.

The former locality of Dulvadilla/Dulbydilla is within the locality of Mundallala.

The town consists of only a few streets.

History
The name Mungallala derives from a pastoral run and comes from the Kunggari language with from mungar / kungar  meaning bird and yaya / lala meaning shout, implying the sound made by the claws of running emus. The name Dulbydilla derives from the Aboriginal words,  meaning black and  meaning waterhole, referring to the discolouration of the water caused by eucalypt leaves.

The town was on the Cobb & Co stagecoach route from Roma to Charleville; The coach traveled the  twice weekly, and they staged at Womalilla Downs, Burenda Downs and Dulbydilla. Mungallala may also have been a "changing station".  The coach drivers included Austin Brumfield, J. Coyle, Tom Merritt, Jim Burstall, Bob Martin and Luke O'Malley. The route was mail service number 15 (Mitchell-Roma) and 16 (Mitchell -Charleville), and ran bi-weekly to 1881, thrice-weekly. In August 1886, the Number 16 route was shortened to Dulbydilla. From March 1887, the coach began at Morven. On 29 February 1888, the Western railway line reached Charleville, seeing the end of the Cobb & Co mail runs through Mungallala.

Dulbydilla Post Office operated from 1886 to 1887, after which a receiving office operated from 1887 to 1924. A telephone office operated from 1953 to 1956.

Mungallala Post Office opened by May 1911 (a receiving office had been open from 1887).

Mungallala Provisional School opened on 5 September 1904. It became Mungallala State School on 1 January 1909.

St John's Anglican church was dedicated on 18 September 1914 by the Venerable Arthur Rivers. It was a timber church able to seat 50 people located south of the railway station (approx ). In 1962, it was relocated to  Charleville Street in the town centre. The church's closure on 5 April 2006 was approved by Archdeacon of The West, G.F. Harch.

Sacred Heart Catholic Church was officially opened and blessed by Archbishop James Duhig on Sunday 8 July 1923. It has since been demolished.

Mungallala Methodist Church was built in 1964. It has now closed.

In 2016, the Australian Taxation Office listed Mungallala as having the lowest mean taxable income by postcode, making it the poorest town in Australia, which led the ABC to do a documentary on the town for their online "storyhunters" program.

Education 
Mungallala State School is a government primary (Prep-6) school for boys and girls at 24 Redford Street. In 2017, the school had an enrolment of 6 students with  2 teachers (1 full-time equivalent) and 4 non-teaching staff (2 full-time equivalent). In 2018, the school had an enrolment of 8 students with 3 teachers (1 full-time equivalent) and 4 non-teaching staff (2 full-time equivalent).

There is no secondary school in Mungallala; the nearest one is Mitchell State School in Mitchell which offers up to Year 10. For education to Year 12, the nearest secondary schools are Roma State College in Roma and Charleville State High School in Charleville.

Facilities 
The Maranoa Regional Council operates a public library in Mungallala in Redford Street

There are 2 free caravan parks in town, and a recreation centre where several events are held each year for local residents and visitors. There are 2 tennis courts and a 4-hole golf course, constantly being mowed by a group of eastern grey kangaroos.

There is a pub and cafe, where internet connectivity (powered through the National Broadband Network) is available. The cafe is also a wildlife care centre.

Other facilities in the town include:

 Mungallala Police Station
 Mungallala Fire Station
 Mungallala Monumental Cemetery

References

Further reading

External links

 

Towns in Queensland
Localities in Queensland
Maranoa Region